A general election was held in the Northern Territory, Australia on Saturday 7 March 1987. Although the incumbent Country Liberal Party (CLP) won a majority under new leader Stephen Hatton, the party's vote was down almost 20 percentage points.

At the 1987 election, the CLP faced a challenge from the Northern Territory Nationals, a rebel conservative party led by former CLP Chief Minister Ian Tuxworth that was aligned with then-Queensland Premier Joh Bjelke-Petersen, but not affiliated with the federal National Party of Australia. The NT Nationals took 17.79% of the primary vote, mostly from the CLP, but finished with only one member in the assembly. Hatton, despite a loss of three seats, retained a working majority.

Labor's vote remained virtually unchanged. As in 1983, its assembly tally was six.

Two former-CLP independents were re-elected in their seats. Noel Padgham-Purich was re-elected to Koolpinyah, while Denis Collins was re-elected to Sadadeen as an independent. Former Chief Minister Ian Tuxworth was also re-elected as a member of the NT Nationals.

Ian Tuxworth's election to the seat of Barkly was declared void after independent candidate Maggie Hickey challenged the result on the basis that the Labor candidate, Keith Hallet, held British nationality and was not an Australian citizen. Due to the close result (Tuxworth had won by only 19 votes), Justice John Nader voided the election on 30 July 1987, and a by-election was held on 5 September 1987, at which Tuxworth regained the seat.

Results 

|}

Retiring MPs

Labor
Bob Collins MLA (Arafura)

Country Liberal
Roger Steele MLA (Elsey)

Candidates

Sitting members are listed in bold. Successful candidates are highlighted in the relevant colour.

Seats changing hands

Post-election pendulum 
The following pendulum is known as the Mackerras pendulum, invented by psephologist Malcolm Mackerras.  The pendulum works by lining up all of the seats held in the Legislative Assembly according to the percentage point margin they are held by on a two-party-preferred basis. This is also known as the swing required for the seat to change hands. Given a uniform swing to the opposition or government parties, the number of seats that change hands can be predicted.

References

Elections in the Northern Territory
1987 elections in Australia
1980s in the Northern Territory
March 1987 events in Australia